Tweed Volcano is a partially eroded Early Miocene shield volcano located in northeastern New South Wales, which formed when this region of Australia passed over the East Australia hotspot around 23 million years ago. Despite its size, Tweed Volcano was not a supervolcano; other shield volcanoes—such as in the Hawaiian Islands—are much larger. In the 23 million years since the volcano was active, erosion has been extensive, forming a large erosion caldera around the volcanic plug of Mount Warning. Its erosion caldera is the largest in the Southern Hemisphere.

Volcanic stratigraphy 

Lavas from the Tweed Volcano are recognised as part of the Lamington Volcanics.

The volcanic stratigraphy of the Tweed Volcano is similar to many other hotspot volcanoes around the world. Eruptions of tholeiitic and some calc-alkaline basalts are the oldest recognised units derived from the volcano. These are named the Lismore Basalt and Beechmont Basalt in New South Wales and Queensland respectively. There are numerous flows recorded which may have been erupted irregularly as fossil soil (Paleosol) profiles and lacustrine type rock units are occasionally found within the rock unit.

Following eruption of the Lismore/Beechmont Basalt a period of eruption of rhyolite lavas took place. Eruptions occurred in lava and some pyroclastic forms. These rhyolites are known in New South Wales as the Nimbin Rhyolite and Queensland as the Binna Burra Rhyolite. Following eruption of this rhyolite a period of basaltic volcanism resumed (or continued) with the eruption of the Blue Knob (NSW)/Hobwee (QLD) Basalt.

The erosion of the volcano has resulted in the exposure of the central feeders of the volcano. These are most evident as Mount Warning and Mount Nullum, though there are numerous other volcanic vents identified all around the region as far away as Nimbin in New South Wales and Spring Mount in Queensland. The central volcanic area in the vicinity of Mount Warning and Mount Nullum is known as the Mount Warning Central Complex and is composed of intrusive rocks including syenite, peralkaline granite, microgranite, monzonite, dolerite, as well as some hyperbassal and volcanic rocks such as rhyolite and basalt.

See also
List of volcanoes in Australia
Tweed Range

References

Mount Warning
Records in the Rocks.  A relatively simple account of the creation of the Tweed Volcano
Green Mountains, Lamington National Park

External links
 Northern Rivers Geology Blog - Tweed Volcano

 
Tweed Shire